School for Stars is a 1935 British romance film directed by Donovan Pedelty and starring Fred Conyngham, Jean Gillie and Torin Thatcher. It was made at British and Dominions Elstree Studios as a quota quickie.

Cast
 Fred Conyngham as Frank Murray  
 Jean Gillie as Joan Martin  
 Torin Thatcher as Guy Mannering  
 Peggy Novak as Phyllis Dawn  
 Ian Fleming as Sir Geoffrey Hilliard  
 Frank Birch as Robert Blake 
 Winifred Oughton as Mrs. Dealtry  
 Victor Stanley as Bill  
 Geraldo as Himself, Geraldo 
 Effie Atherton 
 Phyllis Calvert 
 Rosamund Greenwood

References

Bibliography
 Chibnall, Steve. Quota Quickies: The Birth of the British 'B' Film. British Film Institute, 2007.
 Low, Rachael. Filmmaking in 1930s Britain. George Allen & Unwin, 1985.
 Wood, Linda. British Films, 1927-1939. British Film Institute, 1986.

External links

1935 films
British romance films
1930s romance films
Films directed by Donovan Pedelty
Quota quickies
British and Dominions Studios films
Films shot at Imperial Studios, Elstree
British black-and-white films
1930s English-language films
1930s British films